Sauwerd is a railway station located in Sauwerd, The Netherlands. The station was opened on 15 June 1884 and is located on the Groningen–Delfzijl railway and the Sauwerd–Roodeschool railway. The train services are operated by Arriva.

Train service
The following services currently call at Sauwerd:
2x per hour local service (stoptrein) Groningen - Roodeschool
2x per hour local service (stoptrein) Groningen - Delfzijl

References

External links
 Sauwerd station, station information

Railway stations in Groningen (province)
Railway stations opened in 1884
Railway stations on the Hogelandspoor
Transport in Het Hogeland